Rainbird was an Australian Thoroughbred racehorse who won the 1945 Melbourne Cup.

Ridden by Billy Cook she carried just 7 st 7 lb (48 kg) to victory in the Cup, winning by a margin of  lengths.

Namesake
Australian rail operator CFCL Australia named locomotive CF4407 after the horse.

References

Melbourne Cup winners
1941 racehorse births
Thoroughbred family C7
Racehorses bred in Australia
Racehorses trained in Australia